Zillah Smith Gill (29 May 1859–17 August 1937) was a New Zealand local politician and community leader in Palmerston North. She was born in Kingston upon Hull, Yorkshire, England on 29 May 1859.

References

1859 births
1937 deaths
English emigrants to New Zealand
New Zealand nurses
People from Palmerston North
20th-century New Zealand women politicians
New Zealand Labour Party politicians
Social Democratic Party (New Zealand) politicians
United Labour Party (New Zealand) politicians
20th-century New Zealand politicians
Local politicians in New Zealand